Tigbao, officially the Municipality of Tigbao (Subanen: Benwa Tigbao; Chavacano: Municipalidad de Tigbao), is a 5th class municipality in the province of Zamboanga del Sur, Philippines. According to the 2020 census, it has a population of 21,675 people.

It was created by virtue of Republic Act No. 7162 on November 8, 1991. Tigbao was former part of Municipality of Dumalinao.

Mount Timolan, the highest peak in Zamboanga del Sur, overlooks the town. The name of the town was derived from the abundance of "Tigbao" Grasses in the area.

Geography

Barangays
Tigbao is politically subdivided into 18 barangays.

 Begong
 Busol
 Caluma
 Diana Countryside
 Guinlin
 Lacarayan
 Lacupayan
 Libayoy
 Limas
 Longmot
 Maragang
 Mati
 Nangan-nangan
 New Tuburan
 Nilo
 Tigbao
 Timolan
 Upper Nilo

Climate

Demographics

Economy

References

External links
 Tigbao Profile at PhilAtlas.com
 [ Philippine Standard Geographic Code]
Philippine Census Information

Municipalities of Zamboanga del Sur